The Namibia national football team represents Namibia in international football under the control of the Namibia Football Association (NFA). After Namibia gained independence, the football association was founded in 1990 and became a member of FIFA and the CAF in 1992. The team played its first official match on 7 June 1990 in Windhoek against Mauritius, resulting in a 1–2 defeat.  The match, which was played at the Independence Stadium, also included the nation's first official goal, a 26th-minute strike by Frans Nicodemus.

The following list contains all of Namibia's official matches from 1990 to 2019.

Pre-FIFA results

Official results

1990

1992

1993

1994

1995

1996

1997

1998

1999

2000

2001

2002

2003

2004

2005

2006

2007

2008

2009

2010

2011

2012

2013

2014

2015

2016

2017

2018

2019

References

External links
 FIFA list of matches
 ELO list of matches
 RSSSF list of matches
 Soccerway list of matches
 COSAFA list of matches
 National Football Teams profile
 Football Database profile

Namibia national football team results
1990s in Namibian sport
2000s in Namibian sport
2010s in Namibian sport